Álvaro de Moya (São Paulo, July 19th, 1930 - São Paulo, August 14th, 2017) was a Brazilian journalist, professor, researcher, comics artist, illustrator, writer and TV producer. He was one of the pioneers in academic research on comics in Brazil and one of those responsible for the First International Exhibition of Comics, held in São Paulo in 1951 (the first exhibition of comics in Brazil and one of the first in the world). Moya worked on the Disney comics published by Editora Abril, published novel adaptations at the EBAL publishing house, and made cartoons, illustrations and articles about comics for several newspapers. His first book, Shazam!, published in 1970, is considered one of the most important for Brazilian research on comics. In 1989, he was awarded with the Prêmio Angelo Agostini for Master of National Comics, an award that aims to honor artists who have dedicated themselves to Brazilian comics for at least 25 years.

References

External links 
 
 

Brazilian comics artists
Brazilian comics writers
Brazilian film directors
Brazilian film producers
Brazilian screenwriters
Comics scholars
Disney comics artists
Prêmio Angelo Agostini winners
Academic staff of the University of São Paulo